Rabbanit Channah was the daughter of R. Meir of Ramerupt, sister of Rashbam, the Rivam, and Rabbenu Tam, and granddaughter of Rashi.

She is known only from the Sefer haAsuppot, attributed to the 13th-century scholar Elijah b. Isaac of Carcassonne, which records that "I heard that Rabbanit Channah, the sister of Rabbi Jacob, would warn the women not to begin the blessing until the second candle was lit, lest the women accept the Sabbath and then continue lighting candles."

References
 

12th-century French Jews
12th-century French women
12th-century French people
French Ashkenazi Jews
Medieval Jewish women